Eutropis carinata, commonly known as the keeled Indian mabuya, many-keeled grass skink or (ambiguously) "golden skink", is a species of skink found in South Asia.

Description

Body robust; snout moderate, obtuse. Lower eyelids scaly; vertebral scales smooth. Ear-opening roundish, sub-triangular. Brown to olive or bronze in color above, uniform or with dark-brown or black spots, or longitudinal streaks along the lateral margins of the scales. Sides are dark-brown or chestnut, with or without light spots. A light dorso-lateral line starting from above the eye and continued to the base of the tail. Lower parts whitish or yellowish. Maximum length: 37 cm. and Common length: 25, in which Snout-vent length is 9 cm.

Distribution
Frequently found in Bangladesh, India (except in the North-West), Maldives, Myanmar, Nepal & Sri Lanka and Possibly in Bhutan.

Ecology

Habitat
Sri Lanka subspecies lankae are encountered in many habitat types, from rain forests and deserts to scrub forests and parks and gardens of houses ad cities. 
Diurnal, and terrestrial, frequently seen basking or foraging in open areas.

Diet
Crickets, caterpillars, beetles, and earthworms and even small vertebrates are known to be consumed.

Reproduction
Oviparous; clutches of 2-20 eggs are laid at a time in a self-excavated hole or under fallen logs, between August and September. Eggs are measuring 11 * 17 mm. Hatchlings emerge between May and June, measure 12–12.5 mm.
The male reproductive cycle in Mysore, (southern India),is characterized by peak testicular size and maximum spermatogenic activity and steroidogenic activity during Oct-November which coincides with the female reproductive cycle generally in the dry, post- rainy season of the year.

References

 Gray, J. E. 1846 Descriptions of some new species of Indian Lizards. Ann. Mag. Nat. Hist. (1)18: 429-430
 Smith, M.A. 1935 Reptiles and Amphibia, Vol. II. in: The fauna of British India, including Ceylon and Burma. Taylor and Francis, London, 440 pp.

Eutropis
Reptiles of Nepal
Reptiles of India
Reptiles described in 1801
Taxa named by Johann Gottlob Theaenus Schneider